Heart Bomb is a Canadian short film, directed by Rémi St-Michel and released in 2019. The film stars Alexis Lefebvre as an actor who must confront his fears when a role requires him to perform a dangerous stunt.

The cast also includes Brigitte Poupart, Julianne Côté, Sébastien René, Guillaume Cyr, Éric K. Boulianne, Normand Daoust, Étienne Galloy and Müller Hammadi.

The film won the award for Best Canadian Short Film at the 2019 Quebec City Film Festival, and was a Prix Iris nominee for Best Live Action Short Film at the 22nd Quebec Cinema Awards in 2020.

References

External links

2019 films
2019 short films
Canadian drama short films
French-language Canadian films
2010s Canadian films